American rapper Azealia Banks has released one studio album, two extended plays (EPs), three mixtapes, nineteen singles (including six as a featured artist) and twelve promotional singles. At the age of seventeen in November 2008, Banks adopted the stage name Miss Bank$ and signed to XL Recordings. However, she ended the contract with the label quickly afterwards due to conflicting ideas. In 2009, Banks released several songs onto the internet for free download, including "Gimme a Chance" and "Seventeen". Following her departure from XL Recordings, Banks dropped her stage name, opting to use her legal name, Azealia Banks.

In September 2011, Banks self-released her debut single "212", which charted on the record charts of several countries including Australia, Ireland, and the United Kingdom. The single was certified Platinum by the British Phonographic Industry. In 2012, Banks signed a record deal with Interscope and Polydor to record her debut studio album. During that time, she released her debut EP, titled 1991, which received favorable reviews from music critics. It was further promoted by the single "Liquorice". As of November 2014, the EP has sold 35,000 copies in the United States.

Banks self-released a free mixtape titled Fantasea in July 2012. In July 2014, Banks ended her contract with Interscope and  Polydor, opting to sign to Prospect Park. In November of the same year, her debut studio album Broke with Expensive Taste was released after multiple delays. The album received positive feedback from critics and peaked at number 30 on the US Billboard 200. The album was preceded by three singles, "Yung Rapunxel", "Heavy Metal and Reflective" and "Chasing Time". In March 2015, a fourth single from the album, "Ice Princess", was released. 

In March 2016, Banks released her second mixtape, Slay-Z, which featured collaborations with Nina Sky and Rick Ross. The mixtape was preceded by the single "The Big Big Beat" which was released in February of the same year. When the mixtape was commercially re-released, a promotional single, "Crown" accompanied the work as a bonus track. This was followed by the subsequent promotional singles "Escapades" (2017) and "Movin' On Up (Coco's Song, Love Beats Rhymes)" (2018).

Banks released the singles "Anna Wintour" and "Treasure Island" in 2018 under her most recent former label, eOne Music. In 2019, she released "Count Contessa", which dates back to 2013, as well as the promotional single "Pyrex Princess".

During late 2019, Banks temporarily released her third mixtape, Yung Rapunxel Pt. II on SoundCloud. The title references Banks' 2013 single "Yung Rapunxel". The mixtape would be released as one thirty-minute track consisting of 11 songs until it was eventually taken down. The single "Black Madonna" featuring producer Lex Luger followed in 2020, as did the promotional single "Mamma Mia".

Studio albums

EPs

Mixtapes

Singles

As lead artist

As featured artist

Promotional singles

Notes

References

Discographies of American artists
Hip hop discographies